Hokejski klub Slavija, commonly referred to as HK Slavija or simply Slavija, was an ice hockey club from Ljubljana, Slovenia. Slavija was founded in 1964 and folded in 2018 due to financial problems. The team played their home matches at the Zalog Ice Hall, a 1,000 capacity ice hall in Ljubljana.

Honours
Slovenian Championship
Runners-up (5): 1998–99, 2003–04, 2005–06, 2006–07, 2012–13

Inter-National League
Runners-up: 2012–13

References

Ice hockey clubs established in 1964
Yugoslav Ice Hockey League teams
Slovenian Ice Hockey League teams
Interliga (1999–2007) teams
Slohokej League teams
Inter-National League teams
Sports clubs in Ljubljana
1964 establishments in Slovenia
Defunct ice hockey teams in Slovenia
2018 disestablishments in Slovenia
Ice hockey clubs disestablished in 2018